Gmina Olszyna is an urban-rural gmina (administrative district) in Lubań County, Lower Silesian Voivodeship, in south-western Poland.

Neighbouring gminas
Gmina Olszyna is bordered by the gminas of Gryfów Śląski, Leśna and Lubań.

Villages
Apart from the town of Olszyna, the gmina contains the villages of Biedrzychowice, Bożkowice, Grodnica, Kałużna, Karłowice, Krzewie Małe, Nowa Świdnica and Zapusta.

Twin towns – sister cities

Gmina Olszyna is twinned with:
 Großschönau, Germany
 Ørbæk (Nyborg), Denmark
 Pershotravensk, Ukraine
 Železný Brod, Czech Republic

References

Olszyna
Lubań County